Gustave Henri De Bruyne was a Belgian athlete. He competed in the men's long jump at the 1920 Summer Olympics.

References

External links
 

Year of birth missing
Year of death missing
Athletes (track and field) at the 1920 Summer Olympics
Belgian male long jumpers
Olympic athletes of Belgium
Place of birth missing